Kurşunlu is a Turkish word, and it may refer to:

People
Ramazan Kurşunlu (born 1981), Turkish footballer

Places
Kurşunlu, a town and district of Çankırı Province, Turkey
Kurşunlu, Antalya, a village in Antalya Province, turkey
Kurşunlu, Bayramiç
Kurşunlu, Bursa, a coastline in Gemlik district of Bursa province, Turkey
Kurşunlu, Çanakkale
Kurşunlu, Gölpazarı, a village in Gölpazarı district of Bilecik Province, Turkey
Kurşunlu, Mustafakemalpaşa
Kurşunlu Waterfall Nature Park, a waterfall in Antalya province, Turkey

Other uses
1951 Kurşunlu earthquake, an earthquake occurred in Kurşunlu, Çankırı Province, Turkey
Kuršumli An, an Ottoman caravanserai in Skopje, Macedonia
Kurşunlu Mosque and Complex, a 16th-century mosque in Eskişehir, Turkey